The Wadena Depot is a historic former railway station in Wadena, Minnesota, United States, operated by the Northern Pacific Railway from 1915 to 1971.  The station was listed on the National Register of Historic Places in 1989 under the name Northern Pacific Passenger Depot for having local significance in the theme of transportation.  It was nominated for representing the impact of the Northern Pacific Railway on the establishment and development of Wadena.

Passenger service ceased in 1971, though the adjacent rail line remains in active use by the BNSF Railway.  The building was restored in 2008 and now serves as a visitor center, railroad museum, and event venue.

See also
 National Register of Historic Places listings in Wadena County, Minnesota

References

External links
 The Depot

1915 establishments in Minnesota
Buildings and structures in Wadena County, Minnesota
Former railway stations in Minnesota
Former Northern Pacific Railway stations
Railroad museums in Minnesota
Railway stations on the National Register of Historic Places in Minnesota
Railway stations in the United States opened in 1915
Railway stations closed in 1971
Tourist attractions in Wadena County, Minnesota
National Register of Historic Places in Wadena County, Minnesota